Jordan Hakeem Smith Wint (born April 23, 1991) is a Costa Rican professional footballer.

Club career

Saprissa
Smith began his career with Saprissa in 2011 playing against San Carlos.

Vancouver Whitecaps
Smith was loaned to Vancouver Whitecaps FC on August 6, 2015 through to the end of the 2015 MLS season with an option to extend.

International career
Smith was selected in Costa Rica's squad for the 2011 CONCACAF U-20 Championship. He also played for his country at the 2011 FIFA U-20 World Cup. He made his debut for the senior team on May 28, 2013 in a game against Canada, coming on as a sub for Pablo Herrera.

References

External links

1991 births
Living people
Costa Rican footballers
Costa Rican expatriate footballers
Costa Rica international footballers
Deportivo Saprissa players
Le Havre AC players
Vancouver Whitecaps FC players
A.D. San Carlos footballers
Liga FPD players
Major League Soccer players
Championnat National 2 players
Association football defenders
Footballers from San José, Costa Rica
Expatriate soccer players in Canada
Expatriate footballers in France
Costa Rican expatriate sportspeople in Canada
Costa Rican expatriate sportspeople in France